Tone was a bi-monthly magazine combining coverage of technological developments in New Zealand and from around the world with reviews on the latest consumer products available in New Zealand.

History and profile
It was Parkside Media's third magazine, following NZ Classic Car and NZ Performance Car. Tone was started in 1999. Until issue 32, the magazine was bi-monthly. A change was made to monthly, but as of issue 73 (November/December 2008), it returned to bi-monthly.

Tone'''s offices were in Grey Lynn, Auckland, New Zealand. The magazine ceased publication in December 2011.

Masthead designTone's logo featured a small coloured triangle. Internally this was called 'Jerry'. Jerry changes colour each issue to match the cover design. Version 2 of the logo appeared in issue 32 when the magazine changed to monthly. Version 3 of the logo appeared in issue 44. Version 4 of the logo appeared in issue 67 and changed the tagline to Gadgets | Hi-fi | Home theatre, from Technology to change your life''.

Magazine contents
As of the November/December 2008 issue, the typical magazine contents included:
 News
 Toneworld (short product overviews)
 Reviews (detailed product tests)
 Entertainment (CD, DVD, game reviews)
 Readers' letters
 Contributor columns
 Feature stories (event reviews, technical tips and tricks, how-to articles, company overviews)

References

External links
 Parkside Media website

Bi-monthly magazines
Defunct magazines published in New Zealand
Magazines established in 1999
Magazines disestablished in 2011
Mass media in Auckland
Monthly magazines published in New Zealand
New Zealand news websites
Science and technology magazines
Technology websites
1999 establishments in New Zealand